Punuk is a village and jamoat in north-west Tajikistan. It is located in Asht District in Sughd Region. , the jamoat had a total population of 8,841.

Notes

References

Populated places in Sughd Region
Jamoats of Tajikistan